Sabine Bischoff (21 May 1958 – 6 March 2013) was a German fencer.

Biography
Sabine Bischoff fought for the Fencing-Club Tauberbischofsheim. She won a gold medal in the team foil at the 1984 Summer Olympics, which was the first German Olympic gold medal in this event. Between 1979 and 1986 Bischoff won six medals at world championships in the same team foil event, including a gold in 1985; she lost the individual foil final in 1985 to her teammate Cornelia Hanisch.

Bischoff had degrees in psychology, history and social sciences, and worked as a high school teacher after retiring from competitions. She died after a long, chronic disease. Her brother Stefan also competed in foil, but at a national level.

References

External links
 

1958 births
2013 deaths
German female fencers
Olympic fencers of West Germany
Fencers at the 1984 Summer Olympics
Olympic gold medalists for West Germany
Olympic medalists in fencing
Sportspeople from Koblenz
Medalists at the 1984 Summer Olympics